Henry Philip Mang (11 December 1897 – 30 March 1987) was a Liberal party member of the House of Commons of Canada. He was born in Edenwold, Northwest Territories, which is now in Saskatchewan.

Mang trained in Toronto at the Royal College of Dentistry at the University of Toronto where he also took a one-year honours course in Philosophy, English and History. He participated in World War I under the Royal Flying Corps. Eventually, his jobs included farming and teaching and became a school principal.

Between 1934 and 1938, Mang was a Liberal member of the Legislative Assembly of Saskatchewan for the Lumsden riding.

He was first elected to Parliament at the Qu'Appelle riding in the 1953 general election then after one term was defeated by Alvin Hamilton of the Progressive Conservative party in the 1957 election.

Archives 
There is a Henry Mang fonds at Library and Archives Canada. Archival reference number is R5818.

Electoral record

References

External links
 

1897 births
1987 deaths
Canadian farmers
Canadian military personnel of World War I
Liberal Party of Canada MPs
Members of the House of Commons of Canada from Saskatchewan
Saskatchewan Liberal Party MLAs